Gbemiga Ogunleye is a Nigerian lawyer, journalist, media scholar, and the former Provost of the Nigerian Institute of Journalism.

Education
He obtained a bachelor's degree in laws from the Lagos state University  and a master's degree in media and communication from Pan-Atlantic University but received a Post Graduate Diplomas in Journalism.
He also received a Bachelor of Arts (B.A.) degree in Linguistics from the University of Benin.

Career
Ogunleye was the Head of Corporate Communications at Arik Air, a Nigerian airline operating a domestic, regional and international flight network. He also served as the Deputy Editor-in-Chief of The Punch, a Nigerian daily newspaper. Prior to his appointment as provost of the Nigerian Institute of Journalism to succeed Dr. Elizabeth Ikem, he was the director of News and Current Affairs at TVC News, Nigeria.

References

Nigerian television journalists
Nigerian radio journalists
Nigerian newspaper journalists
University of Lagos alumni
Pan-Atlantic University alumni
University of Benin (Nigeria) alumni
Nigerian editors
Yoruba journalists
Living people
Year of birth missing (living people)